Vansteenkiste is a Dutch surname. Notable people with the surname include:

Alois Vansteenkiste (1928–1991), Belgian cyclist
Jade Vansteenkiste (born 2003), Belgian artistic gymnast
Jannes Vansteenkiste (born 1993), Belgian footballer
Vicente Vansteenkiste (born 1939), Argentine rower

Dutch-language surnames